Sthenopis bouvieri is a species of moth of the family Hepialidae. It was described by Oberthür in 1913, and is known from China.

References

External links
Hepialidae genera

Moths described in 1913
Hepialidae